Prospect Hill railway station served the town of Shiremoor, Tyne and Wear, England from 1847 to 1864 on the Blyth and Tyne Railway.

History 
The station opened on 28 August 1847 by the Seghill Railway. The station was situated north of New York Road, on the A191, and close to the junction with Benton Road. The station was rebuilt when the gradient engineering works were carried out in the 1850s. The station was closed on 27 June 1864.

References

External links 

Disused railway stations in Northumberland
Former North Eastern Railway (UK) stations
Railway stations in Great Britain opened in 1847
Railway stations in Great Britain closed in 1864
1847 establishments in England
1864 disestablishments in England